Sinthusa stephaniae is a butterfly of the family Lycaenidae. It is found on the Philippine islands of Mindanao, Leyte, Negros and Samar. Sinthusa mindanensis stephaniae was raised to species status as Sinthusa stephaniae by Colin G. Treadaway and Heinz G. Schröder in 2012. The forewing length is 12–15 mm. The habitat of subspecies S. s. stephaniae and S. s. mindanensis overlaps on the islands of Mindanao and Leyte.

References

Bibliography

Hayashi, Hisakazu, Schröder, Heinz & Treadaway, Colin G. (1978). "New species of Rapala and Sinthusa from Mindanao (Lepidoptera: Lycaenidae)". Tyô to Ga. 29 (4): 215–219.
Treadaway, C. G. (1995). "Checklist of the butterflies of the Philippine Islands (Lepidoptera: Rhopalocera)". Nachrichten des Entomologischen Vereins Apollo. Suppl. 14: 7–118.

Treadaway, Colin G. & Schröder, Heinz (2012). "Revised checklist of the butterflies of the Philippine Islands". Nachrichten des Entomologischen Vereins Apollo. Suppl. 20: 1-64.

Butterflies described in 1978
Sinthusa